Bohuslav Pospíchal is a retired Czechoslovak slalom canoeist who competed from the late 1950s to the late 1960s. He won four medals at the ICF Canoe Slalom World Championships, with three golds (C-1 team: 1961, 1965, 1967) and a silver (C-1: 1961).

References
 ICF medalists for Olympic and World Championships - Part 2: rest of flatwater (now sprint) and remaining canoeing disciplines: 1936-2007.

Czechoslovak male canoeists
Czech male canoeists
Possibly living people
Year of birth missing (living people)
Medalists at the ICF Canoe Slalom World Championships